Bendigo Stock Exchange (BSX) was a small stock exchange based in  Australia.

The exchange targeted its listing rules at small to medium-sized businesses and offered lower listing fees than the Australian Securities Exchange. It listed various small companies, property trusts, and community-based businesses (such as community bank franchises of the Bendigo Bank).

Trading was all-electronic, conducted by an order matching system in strict price time order. Trading hours were from 9.00am until 2.30pm each weekday after being aligned with Newcastle Stock Exchange hours.  The trading system had been merged onto the NSX NETS platform where stockbrokers can trade either market.

History 
The exchange has a long history. It was founded in the 1860s as the Sandhurst Mining Exchange (Bendigo was called Sandhurst before it became a city), to list shares in mining companies working the rich goldfields of Bendigo and surrounding areas.

The 1870s were the heyday of the exchange, business was booming, and special trains brought investors from Melbourne to buy shares. In November 1871, the exchange had over 1300 listed companies, with a total capitalization around £10,000,000.

The great depression of the 1930s hit the exchange hard, and World War II saw the closure of almost all mines.

In June 2012, it was purchased by the National Stock Exchange of Australia who decided to shut it down.

NSX Limited 

NSX Limited acquired BSX on 12 April 2005.

See also 
 List of stock exchanges in the Commonwealth of Nations
 List of stock exchanges
 Stockbroker
 Brokerage firm

References

External links 
  (former BSX)
 

Buildings and structures in Bendigo
Stock exchanges in Australia
Economic history of Victoria (Australia)
Bendigo
Defunct stock exchanges
Financial services companies disestablished in 2012
1860s establishments in Australia
2012 disestablishments in Australia
Defunct financial services companies of Australia